Waagen is a surname. Notable people with the surname include:

 Adalbert Waagen (1833–1898), German painter
 Carl Waagen (1800–1873), German painter and lithographer
 Gustav Friedrich Waagen (1794–1868), German art historian
 Wilhelm Heinrich Waagen (1841–1900), German geologist and paleontologist